Brécourt was a Nazi Germany bunker in Équeurdreville-Hainneville near Cherbourg, in Manche of Normandy, northern France.

History 
Codenamed Ölkeller Cherbourg ("Cherbourg oil cellar"), Brécourt's structure is located at the foot of a hillside on which the French Navy had eight underground galleries dug for the storage of fuel oil in the 1930s.

These installations were reused by the German army to store V-2 rockets. Early in 1944, the facility was converted to a V-1 flying bomb launch facility.

The Brécourt military installation was virtually undetectable by aerial observation. However, the 387th Bombardment Group records indicate Operation Crossbow bombing in Manche of a "Martinvast V-1 site" on 11 November 1943, which may have been Brécourt.

The launch pad was not fully completed when the Allies captured Brécourt a few days before July 4, 1944. both Dwight Eisenhower and Winston Churchill subsequently visited the facility.

The bunker was declared a French protected monument on 1 December 1996.

See also 
 V-1 flying bomb (facilities)

References

External links 
 Picture from Brécourt today

V-weapon subterranea
Buildings and structures in Manche
History of Manche
Ruins in Normandy
Cherbourg-Octeville
World War II sites in France